Scotty Walden (born November 15, 1989) is an American football coach who is currently the head coach at Austin Peay State University. Walden had previously served as the head coach at East Texas Baptist University and interim head coach at the University of Southern Mississippi.

Playing career
Walden graduated from Cleburne High School in Cleburne, Texas. Following high school he attended three different colleges: Dordt College in Sioux Center, Iowa (2008–2009), Hardin–Simmons University in Abilene, Texas (2009–2011), and finally Sul Ross State University in Alpine, Texas (2011–2012). He played football at all three institutions, and started as quarterback in 2008 and 2011.

Coaching career
Walden's coaching career began in the spring of 2012, while he was still an undergraduate at Sul Ross State. He worked as an offensive assistant under offensive coordinator John Tyree; when Tyree stepped down at the end of the academic year head coach Wayne Schroeder named Walden to replace him. Sul Ross State's offense flourished in 2012, and at the end of the season Joshua Eargle, the new head coach at conference rival East Texas Baptist University, hired Walden away to become offensive coordinator on his staff.

Eargle resigned from the East Texas Baptist job in January 2016, and the university promoted Walden, then 26, to replace him. At the time of his hiring, the NCAA believed Walden to be the youngest college head football coach in the United States. After one year at East Texas Baptist, during which the team compiled a 7–3 record, Walden departed in 2017 to become the wide receivers coach at the University of Southern Mississippi under head coach Jay Hopson, replacing John Wozniak. Walden gained the title of co-offensive coordinator in 2019.

Southern Miss named Walden interim head coach on September 7, 2020, after Hopson stepped down.

On October 27, 2020, Walden was named the new head coach for Austin Peay. He is currently the youngest coach in Division I at 30 years old.

Walden took over coaching duties after non-conference play in 2020–21 and led Austin Peay to a 4–2 record in the conference while the team finished 4–5 overall.

Head coaching record

References

External links
 Austin Peay profile
 Southern Miss profile

1989 births
Living people
American football quarterbacks
Austin Peay Governors football coaches
Dordt Defenders football players
East Texas Baptist Tigers football coaches
Hardin–Simmons Cowboys football players
Southern Miss Golden Eagles football coaches
Sul Ross Lobos football coaches
Sul Ross Lobos football players
People from Cleburne, Texas
Coaches of American football from Texas
Players of American football from Texas